"Something in Your Mouth" is the second single and first promotional single released from Canadian rock band Nickelback's sixth studio album Dark Horse. The song was released as a digital download to the US iTunes Store on October 28, 2008. The song is much heavier than the first single "Gotta Be Somebody", and more like the rest of the album. It was officially released as the second single to rock radio only on December 15, 2008. The song was also used in the seventh film in the American Pie series—American Pie Presents: The Book of Love.

Charts

Weekly charts

Year-end charts

References

2008 singles
Nickelback songs
Song recordings produced by Robert John "Mutt" Lange
Songs written by Robert John "Mutt" Lange
Songs written by Chad Kroeger
2008 songs
Roadrunner Records singles
Songs written by Joey Moi